The Women's 400m Freestyle event at the 2007 Pan American Games took place at the Maria Lenk Aquatic Park in Rio de Janeiro, Brazil, with the final being swum on July 17.

Medalists

Records

Results

Finals

Preliminaries

References
For the Record, Swimming World Magazine, September 2007 (p. 48+49)
Official results

Freestyle, Women's 400m
2007 in women's swimming